Sphaerodactylus armasi, also known commonly as the Guantanamo coastal gecko or the Guantanamo least gecko, is a species of lizard in the family Sphaerodactylidae . The species is endemic to Cuba.

Etymology
The specific name, armasi, is in honor of Cuban zoologist Luis F. de Armas.

Geographic range
S. armasi is found in Guantánamo Province in extreme southeastern Cuba.

Habitat
The preferred natural habitat of S. armasi is dry forest, often with Agave.

Reproduction
S. armasi is oviparous.

References

Further reading
Alfonso, Yasel U.; Charruau, Pierre; Fajardo, Gabriel; Estrada, Alberto R. (2012). "Interspecific communal oviposition and reproduction of three lizard species in Southeastern Cuba". Herpetology Notes 5: 73–77.
Rösler H (2000). "Kommentierte Liste der rezent, subrezent und fossil bekannten Geckotaxa (Reptilia: Gekkonomorpha) ". Gekkota 2: 28–153. (Sphaerodactylus armasi, p. 110). (in German).
Schwartz A, Garrido OH (1974). "A new Cuban species of Sphaerodactylus (Gekkonidae) of the nigropunctatus complex". Proceedings of the Biological Society of Washington 87: 337–344. (Sphaerodactylus armasi, new species).
Schwartz A, Henderson RW (1991). Amphibians and Reptiles of the West Indies: Descriptions, Distributions, and Natural History. Gainesville: University of Florida Press. 720 pp. . (Sphaerodactylus armasi, p. 468).
Schwartz A, Thomas R (1975). A Check-list of West Indian Amphibians and Reptiles. Carnegie Museum of Natural History Special Publication No. 1. Pittsburgh, Pennsylvania: Carnegie Museum of Natural History. 216 pp. (Sphaerodactylus armasi, p. 144).

Sphaerodactylus
Reptiles of Cuba
Endemic fauna of Cuba
Reptiles described in 1974
Taxa named by Albert Schwartz (zoologist)